Colombellinidae is an extinct family of fossil sea snails, marine gastropod molluscs in the clade Littorinimorpha.

References 

 The Taxonomicon

Stromboidea